The 1987 Virginia Slims of Washington was a women's tennis tournament played on indoor carpet courts at the Patriot Center in Fairfax, Virginia in the United States and was part of the Category 3 tier of the 1987 WTA Tour. It was the 16th edition of the tournament and was held from March 23 through March 29, 1987. First-seeded Hana Mandlíková won the singles title and earned $30,500 in first-prize money.

Finals

Singles
 Hana Mandlíková defeated  Barbara Potter 6–4, 6–2
 It was Mandlíková's 2nd singles title of the year and the 27th, and last, of her career.

Doubles
 Elise Burgin /  Pam Shriver defeated  Zina Garrison /  Lori McNeil 6–1, 3–6, 6–4

References

External links
 ITF tournament edition details
 Tournament draws

Virginia Slims of Washington
Virginia Slims of Washington
1987 in sports in Virginia
1987 in American tennis